The Lordly Hudson is a poem and 1962 book of collected poetry by Paul Goodman.

Poem 

Richard Kostelanetz wrote that Goodman's title lyric was his most memorable line:

This is our Lordly Hudson hardly flowing
under the green-grown cliffs

and has no peer in Europe or the East.
Be quiet, heart! Home! Home!

Goodman wrote the poem in February 1937 in reference to his Manhattan homecoming. He was returning by bus during a break from his second semester at the University of Chicago. The text reflects a "passionate pride in home (Manhattan) and a patriotic elation in things familiar". "The Lordly Hudson" was titled "Poem" when published in Five Young American Poets, Second Series (1941). The phrase "lordly Hudson" had been first penned by Washington Irving in the early 1800s.

It became Goodman's most famous poem. American essayist Emile Capouya called "The Lordly Hudson" the greatest New York poem since Walt Whitman. The poem, wrote Capouya, represents Goodman's direct, unsophisticated rhetorical style, which pulls from staid virtues like patriotism. Poet Judson Jerome laughed aloud reading the title lyric for the first time and was surprised to realize that Goodman meant it seriously. What made the poem great, said Gordon Burnside for the St. Louis Post-Dispatch, was Goodman's "patriotic love ... underneath its kidding and fooling".

Goodman continually revised his poems. "The Lordly Hudson" appears in its edited form in his 1972 Collected Poems.

Song 

Composer Ned Rorem put Goodman's poem "The Lordly Hudson" to art song. Rorem first met Goodman in 1938 at a weekly poetry reading in Chicago, when Rorem was an early teenager. Goodman became Rorem's foremost social and poetic influence, his "Manhattan Goethe". Rorem said he had no background in American art songs before he wrote "The Lordly Hudson". He was inspired to set Goodman's poem to song after hearing Francis Poulenc's "C" setting of Louis Aragon, particularly the vocal interval "de la prairie", at a New York Christmas party in 1946. Though he had strugged to set the poem to music before, Rorem wrote the song in one session the next day, beginning with the "Home! Home!" and "No, no!" parts. The result is lyrical and dramatic, with arching, high emotion intervals and "supple melodic phrases" recalling the Hudson River's grandeur atop a "strong rhythmic chordal accompaniment".

Soprano Janet Fairbank, who was known for new American songs, premiered the work without changes. It was known then as "Poem" and later became "Driver, What Stream Is It?" before Goodman titled it "The Lordly Hudson" for the song's publication by Richard Dana. Fairbank died on the day of its publication in 1947. The song was dedicated to her.

The Music Library Association recognized Rorem's "The Lordly Hudson" as the best published song of 1948. It launched his career as his first song, becoming one of his best-known and most-sung. Rorem would continue to set poetry by Goodman to song throughout his career. Vocalists Susan Graham and Nathan Gunn have recorded performances of the song. "The Lordly Hudson" became a cultural touchstone of New York City.

Collection 

The Lordly Hudson: Collected Poems is divided into seven sections: Short Poems, Longer Poems, Stories, Sonnets, Ballades, Love Poems, and Sentences and Prayers.

The Macmillan Company published The Lordly Hudson: Collected Poems in October 1962, with a paperback to follow three months later. The manuscript is held in the Syracuse University special collections. The collection's namesake poem is printed on its cover. Goodman communicates that his intent is the collection to embody an attitude rather than writing beautiful poems. Several of the poems have gay themes.

Poet Harvey Shapiro wrote that the poetry in The Lordly Hudson, Goodman's first solo collection, was "the purest version of his thought ... always serviceable, sometimes awkward ... by rips and starts brilliant." Jerome, on the other hand, found the collection mired in "awkwardness, wordiness, and pointless toying" and that Goodman's attitude comes across in themes of "indiscriminate sexuality, ... admiration for power and shock, plainness and simple pleasures, and an ego throbbing like swollen flesh". 

Poet Denise Levertov considered Goodman's poems to be on par with his short stories, which she said were among America's greatest. While she considered half of the book's poems to be exceptionally, she deemed others exceptionally bad, yet considered Goodman's strength to be the total effect of his voice coming throughout the collection, rather than the quality of individual poems. She found his story poems, however, to be unsuccessful, and his "Red Jacket (Lake Seneca)" to be her favorite.

References

Bibliography

Further reading 

 
 
 
 
 
 
 
 
 
 
 
 https://books.google.com/books?id=JfZsotZGARQC&pg=PT19

External links 

 Poem as published in Five Young American Poets, Second Series (1941)
 
 "What Will the Hudson Be?" 1965 New York Times article by Goodman

1937 poems
1962 poetry books
American poetry collections
Books by Paul Goodman
English-language books
Macmillan Publishers books